Roger C. Field  (born 31 July 1945) is the inventor of the Foldaxe folding electric guitar, which won the Designers' Choice Award for the United States in 1980. He is also an inventor with over 100 patents, an industrial designer, and a guitarist. He has been written about in Playboy magazine 21 times in 16 countries, in Penthouse magazine four times in Europe, and in Esquire. He is in four different Who's Who
books in Europe including one for the European Union.

Early life 
Field was born in London, England. His father was the owner and managing director of Siegmund Robinow & Son Ltd, a company in London and Hamburg, which at that time manufactured exclusive garments. After attending Stagenhoe Park near Hitchin from 1953–1958 he attended The King's School, Canterbury from 1958–1960, then Aiglon College in Switzerland from 1960–1963. Field attended the California College of the Arts in Oakland, California early in 1965 to major in industrial design and graduated with a bachelor's degree. Field also completed courses in film & television at San Francisco State University. In 1969, he filmed the California College of the Arts at the request of Harry X. Ford, the president of the college in 16mm (titled To Be An Artist), which included poet Michael McClure, an English professor at CCAC at the time. The film, which was financed by the college, was later shown on television.

Field, who was also an aviation enthusiast who had received a Private Pilot Licence with a multi-engine rating in California, then moved to Munich to work on the newly formed Airbus project, contributing to the interior design of the aircraft. While in Munich, Field developed drill units reducing the risk of cross contamination for the dental industry ( and other patents).

Field is currently marketing his professional 35mm film camera invention for cinema and television. The camera considerably improves image quality by using unperforated 35mm film (which allows much wider exposed images),. The camera could be used with Field's camera light screening unit (matte box) which been manufactured for many years by the Chrosziel Filmtechnik company in Germany..

Foldaxe 
While designing passenger seats for the Airbus in 1975, Field had the idea for a folding electric guitar which he named "Foldaxe," for being transported as hand luggage under an aircraft seat. Guitarist Chet Atkins inspired Field in 1975 to design a folding guitar without the string tension changing and going out of tune. Field solved this problem by designing a unique mechanism hidden in the guitar which, once the guitar has been tuned, keeps the string tension constant when folding and unfolding it so that it is always ready to play when unfolded.

Atkins appeared with Les Paul on television with the Foldaxe on Jane Pauley's The Today Show and on Entertainment This Week. Field himself appeared several times on television shows with the Foldaxe, unfolding it and then playing it amplified. The Foldaxe was reviewed in Industrial Design magazine, winning the Designers' Choice Award sponsored by I. D. Magazine in 1980 for the entire USA. In 1980, noted industrial designer Raymond Loewy sent Field a letter congratulating him on the design of the Foldaxe.

The Foldaxe was featured in Atkins's book Me and My Guitars. They have been played by many famous musicians and personalities who have been photographed with them, including Keith Richards, Mick Jagger, Eric Clapton, Lenny Breau, Paco de Lucia, John McLaughlin, Hank Marvin, Paul McCartney, David Copperfield, James Burton and Albert Lee.

The interest in The Foldaxe by Hank Marvin, guitarist for The Shadows, led Field to be the instigator in 2001 of the reunion of the Shadows. Jet Harris of The Shadows addressed Field's intention to do so in the Otago Daily Times after meeting with Field and Bruce Welch near Tilburg in the Netherlands. Harris and Welch supported Field's efforts to influence Hank Marvin to return to the band.

Field developed a guitar technique he calls Tap-Picking, a technique of adding additional bass notes to guitar fingerpicking by tapping and pulling-off the bass strings with the left hand at times when the right hand thumbpick and fingers are on the treble strings and cannot play bass notes.

In the text of his tablature booklet with the LP Dadi's Picking Lights Up Nashville, Volume 1, Marcel Dadi cited Field's playing ability as inspiration for the tune Roger Chesterfield.

References

External links 
World News Network article 25 July 2009 (The Guardian) with photo of Field in front of a poster of Arnold Schwarzenegger, much used by World News Network and the press
"The Shadows come out of the darkness" Sunday Herald, Edinburgh 22 Feb 2004  article about Field having reunited The Shadows
"Field days, from Schwarzenegger to the Shadows" The Scotsman, Edinburgh 29 April 2004 article about Field and Arnold Schwarzenegger and Field having reunited The Shadows.
"Roger helped lift the Shadows" The Star, Sheffield 15 Oct 2009
Cyprus Mail, Nicosia 20 April 2007

1945 births
California College of the Arts alumni
British inventors
Artists from London
British male guitarists
Living people
British industrial designers
People educated at The King's School, Canterbury
Alumni of Aiglon College